The 2017–18 Cal State Fullerton Titans men's basketball team represented California State University, Fullerton during the 2017–18 NCAA Division I men's basketball season. The Titans, led by fifth-year head coach Dedrique Taylor, played their home games at the Titan Gym, in Fullerton, California, as members of the Big West Conference. They finished the season 20–12, 10–6 in Big West play to finish in fourth place. They defeated Long Beach State and UC Davis to advance to the championship game of the Big West tournament. In the championship, they defeated UC Irvine to win the tournament and receive the conference's automatic bid to the NCAA tournament. As the No. 15 seed in the East region, they lost to Purdue in the first round.

Previous season
The Titans finished the 2016–17 season 17–15, 10–6 in Big West play to finish in third place. In the Big West tournament, they defeated Cal State Northridge in the quarterfinals, before losing to UC Davis in the semifinals. They were then invited to the CollegeInsider.com Tournament, where they lost to Weber State in the first round.

Offseason

Departures

Incoming transfers

2017 incoming recruits

2018 incoming recruits

Roster

Schedule and results

|-
!colspan=9 style=| Exhibition

|-
!colspan=9 style=| Non-conference regular season

|-
!colspan=9 style=| Big West regular season

|-
!colspan=9 style=| Big West tournament

|-
!colspan=9 style=| NCAA tournament

Source: – <small>All home or Big West matches are televised on BigWest.TV.

Player statistics

References

Cal State Fullerton Titans men's basketball seasons
Cal State Fullerton
Cal State Fullerton Titans men's basketball
Cal State Fullerton Titans men's basketball
Cal State Fullerton